Santiago González was the defending champion, but he lost to the eventual the winner of tournament, Júlio Silva in the second round.
Silva defeated Eduardo Schwank 4–6, 6–3, 6–4 in the final.

Seeds

Draw

Final four

Top half

Bottom half

References

 Main Draw

BH Tennis Open International Cup - Singles
BH Tennis Open International Cup